Stephen A. Jarvis is a British Computer Scientist, academic, and academic administrator. He is currently Provost and Vice-Principal at the University of Birmingham. Prior to this he served as Pro-Vice-Chancellor at the University and Head of its College of Engineering and Physical Sciences.

Before joining the University of Birmingham he was Deputy Pro-Vice-Chancellor (Research) at the University of Warwick, where he led industry-academic partnerships in the area of big data  and established an international scholarship programme in AI. He also supported the establishment of The Alan Turing Institute, the United Kingdom's national institute for data science and artificial intelligence, where he served as a non-executive Director and Trustee between 2018 and 2020.

He studied at London, Oxford and Durham Universities before taking his first Lectureship at the University of Oxford Computing Laboratory. In 2009 he was awarded a four-year Royal Society Industry Fellowship with Rolls-Royce; he continues to support the development of Rolls-Royce's standard aerodynamic design tool, which underpins the way that Rolls-Royce now designs and builds its engines. He became the Director of the EPSRC Centre for Doctoral Training in Urban Science  in 2014 and co-led the founding of the Center for Urban Science and Progress (CUSP) in New York and London. In 2020 he oversaw the trials of the UK's first hydrogen-powered train  and research and development programmes with High Speed 2 (HS2). He is currently a non-executive Director and Chair of Governors for the UK National College for Advanced Transport & Infrastructure.

References 

Living people
Alumni of Queen Mary University of London
Alumni of Exeter College, Oxford
Alumni of Durham University
Members of the Department of Computer Science, University of Oxford
People associated with the University of Warwick
Academics of the University of Birmingham
British computer scientists
English computer scientists
Fellows of the British Computer Society
Year of birth missing (living people)